The Beat Club, Bremen is a live album by the band King Crimson, released through the King Crimson Collectors' Club in February 1999 (see 1999 in music). It was recorded on the German programme Beat Club, in Bremen, West Germany, on October 17, 1972. The video of this performance is included in the deluxe "Larks' Tongues in Aspic" box set.

Track listing
"The Rich Tapestry of Life" (Bill Bruford, David Cross, Robert Fripp, Jamie Muir, John Wetton) 29:49
"Exiles" (Cross, Fripp, Richard Palmer-James) 7:53
"Larks' Tongues in Aspic (Part I)" (Bruford, Cross, Fripp, Muir, Wetton) 6:53

Personnel
Robert Fripp - guitar, mellotron
John Wetton - bass guitar, vocals
David Cross - violin, mellotron, flute
Bill Bruford - drums
Jamie Muir - percussion

Beat Club, Bremen, The
Beat Club, Bremen, The